Willard High School may refer to:

Willard High School (Missouri) — Willard, Missouri
Willard High School (Ohio) — Willard, Ohio